Czechoslovakia competed at the 1984 Winter Olympics in Sarajevo, Yugoslavia.

Medalists

Alpine skiing

Women

Biathlon

Men

Men's 4 x 7.5 km relay

1 A penalty loop of 150 metres had to be skied per missed target.
2 One minute added per missed target.

Cross-country skiing

Men

Women

Women's 4 × 5 km relay

Figure skating

Men

Ice Dancing

Ice hockey

Group B
Top two teams (shaded ones) advanced to the medal round.

Czechoslovakia 10–4 Norway
Czechoslovakia 4–1 USA
Czechoslovakia 13–0 Austria
Czechoslovakia 7–2 Finland
Czechoslovakia 4–0 Canada

Medal round

Czechoslovakia 2–0 Sweden
USSR 2–0 Czechoslovakia

Carried over group match:
Czechoslovakia 4–0 Canada

Leading scorers

Luge

Men

(Men's) Doubles

Women

Nordic combined 

Events:
 normal hill ski jumping 
 15 km cross-country skiing

Ski jumping

References

External links
Official Olympic Reports
International Olympic Committee results database
 Olympic Winter Games 1984, full results by sports-reference.com

Nations at the 1984 Winter Olympics
1984
Winter Olympics